Cristina Elizabeth Recalde Cabañas (born 29 March 1994) is a Paraguayan footballer who plays as a goalkeeper for Spanish Primera Federación club CD Juan Grande and the Paraguay women's national team.

References

External links
Cristina Recalde at BDFútbol

1994 births
Living people
Sportspeople from Asunción
Paraguayan women's footballers
Women's association football goalkeepers
Deportivo Capiatá players
Club Sol de América footballers
Segunda Federación (women) players
Paraguay women's international footballers
Pan American Games competitors for Paraguay
Footballers at the 2019 Pan American Games
Paraguayan expatriate women's footballers
Paraguayan expatriate sportspeople in Spain
Expatriate women's footballers in Spain